Das Capital is a 2003 album released by British singer/songwriter Luke Haines.  The album features orchestral re-recordings of some of his older songs from The Auteurs and Baader Meinhof periods, along with some new tracks.

Track listing
All tracks by Luke Haines

 "How Could I Be Wrong" – 4:33
 "Showgirl" – 4:16
 "Baader Meinhof" – 3:03
 "Lenny Valentino" – 2:16
 "Starstruck" – 3:32
 "Satan Wants Me" – 3:09
 "Unsolved Child Murder" – 2:26
 "Junk Shop Clothes" – 2:46
 "The Mitford Sisters" – 5:02
 "Bugger Bognor" – 3:50
 "Future Generation" – 3:34

Personnel 
Jo Archard - Violin  
 James Banbury - Cello, Orchestration  
 Andrew Cotterill - Photography  
 Alison Dodds - Violin  
 Steve Double - Photography  
 Vincent Greene - Viola  
 Luke Haines - Guitar, Piano, Vocals, Producer, Liner Notes, Omnichord, Orchestration, String Arrangements, String Ensemble  
 Pete Hofmann - Producer, Engineer, Orchestration, String Arrangements, Mixing  
 Everton Nelson - Violin  
 Tim Weller - Percussion, Drums  
 Tim Young - Mastering

References

2003 albums
Luke Haines albums
Hut Records albums